Chatham County may refer to:

Chatham County, Georgia
Chatham County, North Carolina